Peter "Pira" André Hedberg (born 1990) is a Swedish politician, teacher and member of the Riksdag, the national legislature. A member of the Social Democratic Party, he has represented Västernorrland County since September 2022. He is a member of the municipal council in Kramfors Municipality. He is a teacher.

References

1990 births
Living people
Members of the Riksdag 2022–2026
Members of the Riksdag from the Social Democrats
People from Kramfors Municipality
Swedish schoolteachers